Hatay Sümerspor Women's Football was a women's football team based at Defne district in Hatay Province, southern Turkey last playing in the Turkish Women's Third Football League. It was formed in 2013 as part of the 1975-established Hatay Sümerspor Football Club. The club's chairman is Zeki Bayırlı. The team were active five seasons long until 2018. Hatay Sümerspor Women's played home matches at Nazım Koka Football Field in Hatay.

History
The women's football team of the sports club Hatay Sümerspor were formed in 2013, and were admitted in 2013-14 season 
to the Women's Second League, which was the lowest level women's league at that time. With the establishment of the Women's Third League in the 2014-15 season, the team were relegated to the lower level league. They played at the end of the 2017-18 season in the Women's Third League until the umbrella club decided the closure of the women's football department.

Statistics

References

External links 
Hatay Sümerspor on TFF.org

Football clubs in Hatay
Women's football clubs in Turkey
Defne District
Association football clubs established in 1975
Association football clubs established in 2013
1975 establishments in Turkey
2013 establishments in Turkey
Association football clubs disestablished in 2018
2018 disestablishments in Turkey
Defunct football clubs in Turkey